Sunyer I may refer to:
 Sunyer I, Count of Empúries
 Sunyer I of Pallars
 Sunyer, Count of Barcelona